The Minister of Labour is a position in the Government of Austria. Since 2020, the minister has led the Federal Ministry of Labour.

List of Ministers 

 Christine Aschbacher, in the Second Kurz government.
 Martin Kocher, in the Second Kurz government and the Schallenberg government.

References 

Lists of government ministers of Austria
Labor ministers